The ilium is a bone of the pelvic girdle with four bony projections, each serving as attachment points for muscles and ligaments:

 Anterior superior iliac spine
 Anterior inferior iliac spine
 Posterior superior iliac spine
 Posterior inferior iliac spine

Pelvis
Skeletal system
Ilium (bone)